Melpattampakkam is a panchayat town in Cuddalore district in the Indian state of Tamil Nadu.

As of the 2011 India census, Melpattampakkam (Melpattambakkam) had a population of 6,887 with 3,475 males and 3,412 females. Out of the total population, 9.43 per cent is under six years of age.

Religion 
The city has a Ahle Hadees Mosque. Arcot Lutheran Church was built in 1861 (150-year-old). There are at least six temples in the city.

Schools 
Govt. High School.
Ananda matriculation school.
St. Dominic Matriculation High School.
 Girls Christian Higher Secondary School.
 Panchayat Union Middle School.
 Panchayat Union Primary School, Nathamedu.
 Panchayat Union Primary School(Boys).

Transportation

Road Transport 
Melpattampakkam has a robust road network. Frequent buses are available to nearby localities such as Nellikuppam, Panruti and Villupuram. State Highway SH-9 which connects Cuddalore, Villupuram, Thiruvannamalai and Vellore districts passes through Melpattampakkam.

Airports
The most neighbouring airport is in Puducherry - Pondicherry Airport -  at a distance of 42.2 kilometres. Spicejet operates regular flights connecting Puducherry to Hyderabad.

Railways 
Melpattampakkam has a railway station - station code MBU. It is under the control of the Tiruchirappalli Division of the Southern Railway zone of the Indian Railways. Trains running between Mayiladuthurai and Villupuram pass through this station.

References

Cities and towns in Cuddalore district